Hasyim Kipuw (born 9 May 1988) is an Indonesian professional footballer who plays for Liga 1 club Madura United. Although primarily a centre-back, he has also been used as a right-back or defensive midfielder.

Club career

Arema Cronus
On 2 December 2014, he signed with Arema Cronus.

Return to Arema
On 11 April 2022, Kipuw return to Arema in the 2022–23 season. He made his league debut on 30 July 2022 as a substitute in a match against PSIS Semarang at the Kanjuruhan Stadium, Malang.

Career statistics

Club

International

Honours

Clubs
Arema
 Menpora Cup: 2013
 Indonesian Inter Island Cup: 2014/15
 Indonesia President's Cup: 2022

PSM Makassar
 Piala Indonesia: 2019

International
Indonesia U-23
Southeast Asian Games  Silver medal: 2011

Personal life 
Kipuw is a devout Muslim who observes the Islamic month of Ramadan.

References

External links 
 
 

1988 births
Living people
Indonesian Muslims
Indonesian footballers
People from Tulehu
Sportspeople from Maluku (province)
Persija Jakarta players
Arema F.C. players
Bhayangkara F.C. players
Persebaya Surabaya players
Liga 1 (Indonesia) players
Indonesia youth international footballers
Indonesia international footballers
Association football fullbacks
Association football midfielders
Bali United F.C. players
Southeast Asian Games silver medalists for Indonesia
Southeast Asian Games medalists in football
Competitors at the 2011 Southeast Asian Games
21st-century Indonesian people